Thomas Trotter may refer to several people:

 Thomas Trotter (impresario), (1779–1851), English theatrical impresario
 Thomas Trotter (physician), (1760–1832), Scottish naval doctor and abolitionist
 Thomas Trotter (trade unionist), (1871–1932), English trade unionist
 Thomas Trotter (musician), (born 1957), English concert organist